Paternostro Glacier is a glacier, 11 nautical miles (20 km) long, in the Wilson Hills. It flows between Cook Ridge and Goodman Hills to enter the east part of Davies Bay. Mapped by United States Geological Survey (USGS) from surveys and U.S. Navy air photos, 1960–63. Named by Advisory Committee on Antarctic Names (US-ACAN) for Lieutenant (j.g.) Joseph L.A. Paternostro, U.S. Navy Reserve, Navigator in LC-130F Hercules aircraft during Operation Deep Freeze 1967 and 1968.

Glaciers of Oates Land